Tibor Papp (5 April 1944 – February 2014) was a Hungarian boxer. He competed in the men's flyweight event at the 1964 Summer Olympics. At the 1964 Summer Olympics, he lost to John Kamau of Kenya.

References

1944 births
2014 deaths
Hungarian male boxers
Olympic boxers of Hungary
Boxers at the 1964 Summer Olympics
Sportspeople from Oradea
Flyweight boxers